The following is a list of Jewish youth organizations.

 

 
Jewish